Thiruvattar was an assembly constituency located in Nagercoil Lok Sabha Constituency in Kanyakumari district in Tamil Nadu.

Travancore-cochin assembly

Madras State assembly

Tamil Nadu assembly

ELection results

2006

2001

1996

1991

1989

1984

1980

1977

1971

1967

1954

1952

References

External links
 

Former assembly constituencies of Tamil Nadu
Kanyakumari district